Robert Rateau (born 8 June 1975) is a Mauritian former international footballer who played as a striker. He won 23 caps and scored 5 goals for the Mauritius national football team.

References

External links

1975 births
Living people
Mauritian footballers
Mauritius international footballers
Mauritian expatriate footballers
Association football forwards
Mauritian expatriate sportspeople in Réunion
Expatriate footballers in Réunion